Gerga is a rural locality (a selo) in Kayakentsky District, Republic of Dagestan, Russia. The population was 3,913 as of 2010. There are 49 streets.

Geography 
Gerga is located 8 km southwest of Novokayakent (the district's administrative centre) by road. Shalasi and Novye Vikri are the nearest rural localities.

Nationalities 
Dargins live there.

References 

Rural localities in Kayakentsky District